Faizal Edavalath Kottikollon (born July 6, 1963) is a United Arab Emirates-based Indian entrepreneur and philanthropist. He is the founder and chairman of KEF Holdings – a diversified company known for establishing technologically integrated enterprises across multiple industries. He is also Chairman of the Board of Meitra Hospital – an advanced tertiary care hospital in Kozhikode, Kerala.

Kottikollon co-founded the Faizal & Shabana Foundation with his wife, Shabana, in 2007.

Kottikollon was named "One of the Top 100 Indian Business Leaders in the Arab World" by Forbes Middle East and as "One of the 20 Most Influential Indian Leaders in Gulf Construction" by Construction Week.

Early life and education 
Kottikollon was born in Mahé, India, on July 6, 1963. His father, PK Ahammed, is the Chairman of Peekay Group of Companies. 

Kottikollon attended St. Joseph's Boys' Higher Secondary School, Kozhikode, and he received his BE (1983–87) in Civil Engineering from Manipal Institute of Technology and his MBA (1988–90) in Business Administration, Management & Operations from T. A. Pai Management Institute. In 1990, Kottikollon earned a Master of Science degree in Industrial Engineering from Bradley University, Peoria, Illinois.

Career

Emirates Techno Casting 

With a seed capital of US$5,000, Kottikollon started his first venture, a steel scrap trading company called Al Ahamadi General Trading in Ajman in 1995. In 1997, he set up Emirates Techno Casting in Ajman with profits from his scrap trading business and the support from his father. In 2002, he founded Emirates Techno Casting FZE and JC Middle East (JCME) in the Hamriyah Free Zone in Sharjah to trade in valves. Kottikollon's wife, Shabana, joined his business in 2002 and managed the Human Resources and Administrative areas while he focused on technology and production.

In 2007, they set up the ETC Community Center, which led to the establishment of the Faizal & Shabana Foundation in 2007 as "a charitable trust which aims to leverage the business models they developed in the oil and gas sector". In the same year, Kottikollon established KEF Holdings as the parent company for the group with the "goal to provide poorer areas of the world with the education, training and healthcare they sorely lack through the use of technology and collaboration".

In 2008, Dubai International Capital (DIC), the investment arm of the government-owned Dubai Holding, acquired a 45 percent stake in Emirates Techno Casting for $126 million.

In 2011, Tyco International announced it completed the acquisition of 75% equity stake in Emirates Techno Casting, worth US$300 million, including the stake originally acquired by DIC. Tyco further acquired the remaining 25% stake, held by Kottikollon, for an additional US$100 million.

KEF Holdings

After the sale of Emirates Techno Casting to Tyco, KEF Holdings was registered in Singapore in 2012. KEF Company Ltd. was then established as the corporate headquarters of the group in Dubai’s International Financial Center.

KEF Infrastructure 
Kottikollon established KEF Infrastructure India Private Limited in 2014 "for the fabrication and supply of concrete elements including columns, beams, hollow core slabs, architectural cladding panels, aggregate finished panels and staircases". His first investment in infrastructure was KEF Infra One Industrial Park, "where a network of smart factories are driven by human enterprise and cyber-physical systems". The facility was built on 42 acres of land in Krishnagiri with an investment of US$100 million, and it focuses on designing, engineering, and manufacturing buildings, including on-site assembly and project management. KEF Infra won several projects such as the 1.5 million square feet Embassy 7B in Bangalore completed in 13.5 months, the Indira Canteens in Karanataka, a 700,000 square feet office park for Infosys, and Gems Modern Academy in Kochi.In 2018, Katerra, a US-based Softbank-backed tech firm, and KEF Infra merged to form KEF Katerra to build critical infrastructure such as hospitals and schools.

KEF Healthcare 
In 2017, Kottikollon established Meitra Hospital, KEF Healthcare's first tertiary care hospital in Kozhikode, Kerala. The 400,000 square foot tertiary hospital has five departments: Heart and Vascular, Bone and Joint, Neuroscience, Gastroenterology, and Urology. Meitra was built using KEF Infra's offsite construction technology in 18 months.

Meitra's model was developed by physicians from Cleveland Clinic, USA. Australian design firm, TAHPI designed the hospital with 52 individual intensive care units, 28 consulting rooms, 7 operating theaters, and 6 emergency units.

Philanthropy

Faizal and Shabana Foundation 

Kottikollon is the co-founder and director of the Faizal & Shabana Foundation, established in 2007. The Foundation is driven by the vision of "Giving to Create Impact". The Foundation focuses on Education and Youth Development, Healthcare and Wellness Support, Regenerative Sustainable Development, Humanitarian Aid and Assistance; Community Outreach and Support; and Art and Culture Development.

Education and Youth Development
In 2013, the Faizal & Shabana Foundation refurbished and upgraded a 120-year-old Government Vocational Higher Secondary School for Girls’ in Nadakkavu in Kozhikode, Kerala. This model extended to 1,000 schools in the state. The school has reported 400 percent improvement in the class X state board exam results.

Regenerative Sustainable Development
In 2015, the Foundation launched the Krishnagiri Village Development Project (KVDP), an integrated community development programme to improve the lives of 3,792 households living in the underdeveloped Ennegollu village in Krishnagiri district, Tamil Nadu.

KVDP initiatives include upgrades to a government primary school, skill development and women empowerment programmes, promotion of organic farming, and hygiene and sanitation projects. The government primary school was upgraded from a one-classroom institution with 23 students and one teacher into a full-fledged primary school with 145 students, six teachers, a library and computer center.

Honors 
Kottikollon has been conferred several encomiums over the past two decades. 
 International Community Services Award 2012 of the Global Organization of People of Indian Origin
 Ranked among 100 Most Powerful Indians in the Gulf 2014
 Ranked among The GCC's 100 Most Powerful Indians 2014
 PV Sami Memorial Award 2016 for his valuable contribution in business and philanthropy
 Top 100 Indian Leaders in the UAE by Forbes Magazine (2016)
 Ranked in Construction Week's The 20 most influential Indian leaders of Gulf construction
 Ranked in Arabian Business Indian Aces 2018
 Ranked among 50 Most Powerful Indians in the UAE 2017
 Ranked in Arabian Business Richest Indians in the UAE 2018

References

1963 births
Living people
People from Mahe district
Emirati philanthropists
Entrepreneurship in India
Emirati businesspeople